The premier of Queensland is the head of government in the Australian state of Queensland.

By convention the premier is the leader of the party with a parliamentary majority in the unicameral Legislative Assembly of Queensland. The premier is appointed by the governor of Queensland.

The incumbent premier of Queensland since the 2015 election is Annastacia Palaszczuk of the Labor Party.

Constitutional role
Under section 42 of the Constitution of Queensland the premier and other members of Cabinet are appointed by the governor and are collectively responsible to Parliament. The text of the Constitution assigns to the premier certain powers, such as the power to assign roles (s. 25) to assistant ministers (formerly known as parliamentary secretaries), and to appoint ministers as acting ministers (s. 45) for a period of 14 days.

In practice, under the conventions of the Westminster System followed in Queensland, the premier's power is derived from two sources: command of a majority in the Legislative Assembly, and the premier's role as chair of Cabinet, determining the appointment and roles of ministers. Although ministerial appointments are the prerogative of the governor of Queensland, in normal circumstances the governor will make these appointments under the "advice" (in reality, direction) of the premier.

Immediately following an election for the Legislative Assembly, the governor will call on the leader of the party which commands a majority in the Legislative Assembly to become premier and ask them to commission a government. A re-elected government will be resworn, with adjustments to the ministry as determined by the premier.

Prior to the existence of political parties within the Leglislative Assembly, to become premier, that member had to be able to command the support of a majority of the individual members of the assembly; this group of members were known informally as Ministerialists, while those who did not support the member who became premier were known informally as Oppositionists (or the Opposition).

Premier's office
The premier has an office in the Executive Annexe of Parliament House, Brisbane, which is normally used while Parliament is sitting. At other times the premier's ministerial office is in 1 William Street, which is across the road from the Executive Annexe.

List of premiers of Queensland
Before the 1890s, there was no developed party system in Queensland. Political affiliation labels before that time indicate a general tendency only. Before the end of the first decade of the twentieth century, political parties were more akin to parliamentary factions, and were fluid, informal and disorganised by modern standards.

Graphical timeline

See also
 List of premiers of Queensland by time in office
 Government of Queensland
 Politics of Queensland

References
Notes

Citations

External links

Queensland, Premiers
Premiers